Lav (also Romanized as Lāv; also known as Lū) is a village in Talkhuncheh Rural District, in the Central District of Mobarakeh County, Isfahan Province, Iran. At the 2006 census, its population was 232, in 63 families.

References 

Populated places in Mobarakeh County